I Turn to You may refer to:

I Turn to You (album), a 2008 album by Richie McDonald
I Turn to You, a 2010 album by Ahmad Hussain
"I Turn to You" (George Jones song), 1987
"I Turn to You" (All-4-One song), 1997, covered by Christina Aguilera in 1999 for her eponymous debut album
"I Turn to You" (Melanie C song), 2000

he:I Turn to You